The 2020 season was the 13th season for the Indian Premier League franchise Mumbai Indians. They were one of the eight teams competing in the 2020 Indian Premier League. Mumbai Indians were the defending champions. The team is currently being captained by Rohit Sharma with Mahela Jayawardene as team coach. They won their fifth ever title by beating Delhi Capitals on 10 November 2020.

Background

Player retention and transfers 

In July 2019, Mumbai added all-rounder Sherfane Rutherford to their squad, after trading Mayank Markande to Delhi Capitals. They also traded in New Zealand left-arm pacer Trent Boult from Delhi Capitals and right-arm pacer Dhawal Kulkarni from Rajasthan Royals, while trading away batsman Siddhesh Lad to the Kolkata Knight Riders.

The Mumbai Indians retained 15 players and released ten players. On 2 September 2020, James Pattinson replaces Lasith Malinga for Mumbai.

Retained players: Rohit Sharma, Hardik Pandya, Jasprit Bumrah, Krunal Pandya, Ishan Kishan, Surya Kumar Yadav, Rahul Chahar, Anmolpreet Singh, Jayant Yadav, Aditya Tare, Anukul Roy, Quinton de Kock, Kieron Pollard, Lasith Malinga, Mitchell McClenaghan.

Released players: Evin Lewis, Adam Milne, Jason Behrendorff, Beuran Hendricks, Ben Cutting, Yuvraj Singh, Barinder Sran, Rasikh Salam, Pankaj Jaswal, Alzarri Joseph.

Traded In:  Sherfane Rutherford, Trent Boult and Dhawal Kulkarni.

Traded Out: Mayank Markande and Siddhesh Lad.

Auction
Mumbai Indians entered the IPL 2020 auction with a purse of 13.05 crores INR. However, with an extremely strong core, the team hardly had any of the bases uncovered. Yet, MI went on to purchase Chris Lynn , who was released last year by Kolkata Knight Riders, for the base price of 2CR INR and Aussie Nathan Coulter-Nile for a whopping 2CR INR. Also, Indian middle order batsman Saurabh Tiwary, who has been a part of the team before, right arm Indian Pacer, Mohsin Khan and all-rounder Prince Balwant Rai Singh and Maharashtra pacer Digvijay Deshmukh joined the team after being purchased for the base prices of 50L, 20L and, 20L respectively.

Players bought: Chris Lynn, Nathan Coulter-Nile, Saurabh Tiwary, Mohsin Khan, Digvijay Deshmukh, Prince Balwant Rai Singh.

Team Analysis
ESPNcricinfo wrote "Like Chennai Super Kings, Mumbai Indians also had a limited money, which they made good use for purchasing the players. When Malinga's backup took the team to Coulter Nile, then Chris Lynn was included as a replacement for Evin Lewis. It will be interesting to see how the Mumbai team uses new young domestic players. Only the spin department is a concern for the team."

Indian Premier League
On 19 September, Mumbai Indians lost the opening match against Chennai Super Kings. After losing the toss, Mumbai scored 162 runs with loss of 9 wickets.  Chasing a target of 163, Chennai had lost two wickets early, but Ambati Rayudu (71) and Faf du Plessis (58) brilliant inning and their century partnership (115-run) with Faf du Plessis, helped the Super Kings to beat the defending champions. For Mumbai Trent Boult, James Pattinson, Krunal Pandya and Rahul Chahar took 1–1 wickets.

On 23 September, Mumbai Indians won their first match of the season, defeating the Kolkata Knight Riders. Rohit Sharma lost the toss and was put into bat. Rohit scored 80 off 54 balls and Suryakumar Yadav's 47 off 28 balls, set 195-run target for Knight Riders. Chasing a target of 196, the team had lost two wickets in five overs. Shivam Mavi 9 off 10 balls was stumped on the final ball of the match and the Knight Riders could only score 146/9 in 20 overs losing the match by 49 runs.

On 28 September, Mumbai Indians lost their second match against the Royal Challengers Banglore by 7 wickets in a super over. Rohit won the toss and elected to field. Devdutt Padikkal and Aaron Finch built an 81-run partnership for the first wicket and After that Virat Kohli scored 3 runs off 11 balls, in the last 7 overs Royal Challengers scored 105 runs, helping them finish the innings at 201/3 in 20 overs. Chasing a target of 202, Mumbai had lost two wickets in the first two overs, but Ishan Kishan's 99 off 58 balls and a 119-run partnership with Kieron Pollard powered their team to tie the match at 201/5 in 20 overs. In the super over Mumbai could manage only 7 runs only, which was easily chased by the RCB pair featuring Virat Kohli and AB de Villiers. Mumbai went on to win their next 5 matches but they lost to Kings XI Punjab in a second Super Over, followed by a thumping win over the Chennai Super Kings, but lost to Rajasthan Royals in which Ben Stokes scored his second IPL century, followed by a win in the second fixture against RCB. Then they defeated the Delhi Capitals for second time by 9 wickets and then lost to Sunrisers Hyderabad in their final group game by 10 wickets, but still managed to comfortably top the points table. Mumbai played Delhi again in Qualifier 1. Mumbai won comfortably against Delhi by 57 runs due to contributions from Jasprit Bumrah, Ishan Kishan, Hardik Pandya, Quinton de Kock,  Suryakumar Yadav and Trent Boult, and reached their sixth IPL final. On 10 November, Mumbai faced against the same team and won the match. Delhi had won the toss and decided to bat first and posted a modest score of 157/5.Mumbai batted second and won the match by 5 wickets to win their fifth IPL title. Rohit Sharma was the top scorer for Mumbai scoring 68 runs and also played his sixth final and his 200th match, whereas Trent Boult was the top named man of the match getting 3 wickets for 30 runs. Mumbai also became the second team after CSK to defend their title successfully, after the latter had done so in the 2010 and 2011 editions of the competition, coincidentally 10 years after the original feat.

Squad
 Players with international caps are listed in bold.

Administration and support staff

Kit manufacturers and sponsors

Teams and standings
 Results by match 

League table

League stage

Playoffs

Qualifier 1

 Final 

Statistics
Most runs

 Source:Cricinfo

Most wickets

 Source:'Cricinfo

Player of the match awards

References

External links
Official Website

Mumbai Indians seasons
2020 Indian Premier League